The Chillout Project is a series of compilations featuring house, downtempo, and lounge music by various artists compiled and produced by Anton Ramos.

Anton started The Chillout Project as a radio program in the Philippines back in 1997 on local radio station 99.5 RT. It focused on downtempo and trip hop.

It was not the lone electronica/dance music show on air until 2002, when the show transferred to a new station, Joey 92.3 where it can still be heard today.

Anton is most famous for his sunset sessions in the beach island of Boracay. The Chillout Project has become the largest selling electronica/dance compilation album series in the Philippines today.

Since its release, the chillout compilations have featured tracks from diverse artists of the electronica, trance, ambient, and lounge music scene such as: Thievery Corporation, Groove Armada, Wamdue Project, Moloko, Bliss, Sade, Roger Sanchez, Chicane, Anggun, and Zero 7.

The Chillout Project compilations
 "The Chill Out Project"
 Release Date: October 23, 2000
 Label: Universal Records
 "The Lounge Story" 
 Release Date: December 12, 2001
 Label: Universal Records
 "The Chillout Project: A Soundtrack To Modern City Life"
 Release Date: May 23, 2002
 Label: Sony Music Philippines
 "The Chillout Project: House Sessions"
 Release Date: November 14, 2003
 Label: EMI Philippines
 "The Chillout Project: House Sessions 2" 
 Release Date: November 19, 2004
 Label: EMI Philippines
 "The Chillout Project: Acid Jazz"
 Release Date: June 4, 2005
 Label: EMI Philippines
 "The Chillout Project: Sisters Of The Sun"
 Release Date: September 2005
 Label: EMI Philippines
 "The Chillout Project: House Sessions 3"
 Release Date: November 2005
 Label: EMI Philippines

Compilation album series